Sheykh Saluy-e Olya (also Romanized as Sheykh Salūy-e ‘Olyā and Sheikh Salooy Olya; also known as Shaikh Silu Yukāri, Sheykh Salū-ye Bālā, Sheykh Salū-ye ‘Olyā, Sheykh Selū-ye Bālā, and Sheykh Solū-ye Bālā) is a village in Chaldoran-e Jonubi Rural District, in the Central District of Chaldoran County, West Azerbaijan Province, Iran. At the 2006 census, its population was 117, in 30 families.

References 

Populated places in Chaldoran County